Andrzej Markowski (22 August 1924 – 30 October 1986) was a Polish composer and conductor. He was born in Lublin and died in Warsaw.  He was the director of the Wrocław Philharmonic from 1965 to 1968 and founded the Wratislavia Cantans festival.

He was awarded the Minister of Culture and Art Award, 2nd class in 1965. He received the "Orpheus" critics' award in 1968 and 1971. In 1969 he was awarded the annual Polish Composers' Union prize and in 1974 he received the State Award, 1st class.

Selected Film music 
 Colonel Wolodyjowski (1968)
 The Silent Star (1960)
 A Generation (1954)

References

External links 

1924 births
1986 deaths
Polish composers
Polish conductors (music)
Male conductors (music)
Musicians from Lublin
20th-century conductors (music)
20th-century composers
20th-century male musicians
Recipients of the State Award Badge (Poland)